Jack "Dutch" Garfinkel (June 13, 1918 – August 14, 2013) was an American basketball player.

Garfinkel attended Thomas Jefferson High School in Brooklyn and then nearby St. John's University to play for future Hall of Fame coach Joe Lapchick.  In 1941, he won the Haggerty Award, given to the top player in the New York City metropolitan area.

After his college career was over, Garfinkel served in the United States Army during World War II.  He then played for the Philadelphia Sphas of the American Basketball League, the Rochester Royals of the National Basketball League (NBL), and finally settled in with the Boston Celtics of the Basketball Association of America (BAA), where he was a member of the franchise's first team in 1946–47.  Garfinkel lasted three seasons with the Celtics, but his career ended prior to the NBL/BAA merger that formed the National Basketball Association in 1949.

After his playing days were over, Garfinkel became a basketball coach and official. He died on August 14, 2013. At the time of his death, he was the last player who was still alive from the inaugural Celtics team.

BAA career statistics

Regular season

Playoffs

See also
List of select Jewish basketball players

References

1918 births
2013 deaths
American men's basketball players
Basketball players from New York (state)
Boston Celtics players
Jewish American sportspeople
Jewish men's basketball players
Philadelphia Sphas players
Point guards
Rochester Royals players
St. John's Red Storm men's basketball players
Thomas Jefferson High School (Brooklyn) alumni
United States Army soldiers
United States Army personnel of World War II
21st-century American Jews